Cranbrook (formally Cranbrook College) was an independent co-educational school, located in Ilford, Greater London, England. The Cognita Group owned and operated the school until its closure in 2016. At that time the school covered the full range of academic years from Nursery to Year 11. Previously, in 2011, Cranbrook had merged with Glenarm College, another Cognita school in Ilford.

History
Cranbrook School (formerly known as Cranbrook College) was founded in 1896 as a boys only school. The school was acquired by Cognita Schools Limited in April 2007.

In January 2011, Cranbrook and Glenarm Colleges integrated into a new site at Mansfield Rd, adjacent to the existing Cranbrook College campus. The schools, which shared the same founder, then re-branded themselves under the new title of Cranbrook and were fully co-educational.

Cranbrook School closed in July 2016 because of reduced pupil numbers.

Buildings
Initially, the school consisted of the main building on 34 Mansfield Road and an old building exiting onto Cranbrook Road. The old building comprised 4 main classrooms, the school hall, library, science lab and art room.

In 1992, the school opened the Thornley building, a 2-storey raised building over the main playground. This building comprised two rooms ("T1" and "T2") on the first floor and a larger third room ("T3") spanning the entire building on the second storey which could be partitioned into two smaller rooms. T3 was initially the art room but later became the computer room in the early 2000s. The art room moved to the old building above the science lab where the original computer room was situated.

Following the merger, with Glenharm Collage the school had invested four million pounds into new building facilities. The school purchased the "Waverley Lodge Care Home" building next door to the school and expanded the preparatory department within the new space.

Notable former pupils
Ian Greer (1933-2015), political lobbyist, who had a very successful career, until the 1994 Cash-for-questions affair

Former Head teachers
 Mr Gerald Reading
 Mr Charles Lacey

References

Cognita
Educational institutions established in 1896
Educational institutions disestablished in 2016
Ilford
1896 establishments in England
Defunct schools in the London Borough of Redbridge
2016 disestablishments in England